Coins in the Fountain is a 1952 novel by John Hermes Secondari, from which was adapted the 1954 Academy Award-winning film, Three Coins in the Fountain. It was remade in 1964 as the Oscar-nominated film The Pleasure Seekers and again in 1990 as Coins in the Fountain.

References

1952 American novels
Works by John Secondari
American novels adapted into films
Novels set in Rome
J. B. Lippincott & Co. books